Lyle Sendlein (born March 16, 1984) is a former American football center. He was signed by the Arizona Cardinals as an undrafted free agent in 2007. He played college football at Texas.

Early years
Coached by Ron Estabrook at Chaparral High School in Scottsdale, Arizona, Sendlein was a four-year letter winner and three-year starter as a prepster. He started varsity football early and became a first-team all-region choice at offensive tackle as a sophomore. He started at defensive tackle and linebacker as a senior, linebacker as a junior and offensive tackle as a sophomore. Sendlein also helped lead team to back-to-back Arizona 4A State Championships in 1999–2000 and a 28-game winning streak. He became a first-team all-state, all-region and all-city selection as a senior he posted 110 tackles, six sacks, three fumble recoveries (one returned for a TD) and a 29-yard interception return for a TD that year, he also had 21 tackles, two sacks and a 29-yard INT return for a TD against rival Saguaro in 2001. He earned second-team all-state and first-team all-region and all-city honors as a junior. Sendlein was also named the Valley's 2000 Defensive Player of the Year. He racked up 157 tackles that year, his top game of his junior season was a 19-tackle performance against the Saguaro Sabrecats.

College career
Sendlein played in 50 games while at Texas and he started in his final 26 games. He was a two-time all-conference performer as center in the Big 12.  He started for the 2005 National Championship team and helped the Longhorns set an NCAA single-season record with 652  total points scored and a UT single-season record with 6,657 total offensive yards.

He earned a degree in liberal arts in December 2006.

Professional career
Sendlein went undrafted in the 2007 NFL Draft, but signed with the Arizona Cardinals as an undrafted free agent. On his signing with the Cardinals, Sendlein said, "I had about 20 to 25 teams call to check on my status, but my agent and I felt like Arizona would be a good fit." said Sendlein.  It has been a homecoming for Sendlein since he played for Scottsdale Chaparral. 

Sendlein started only 2 games as a rookie in 2007. He became the starting center for Arizona in his second year, and had maintained that position without missing a game for 3 years (2008–2010).

On March 12, 2015, Sendlein was released, but he re-signed with the team on August 7, 2015.

Personal
Sendlein, who is of German descent, is the son of former NFL player Robin Sendlein and Carrie Sendlein.

References

External links
Arizona Cardinals bio

1984 births
Living people
Players of American football from Minnesota
American football centers
Texas Longhorns football players
Arizona Cardinals players